That Man Jack! is a 1925 American silent Western film directed by William James Craft and starring Bob Custer, Mary Beth Milford, and Hayford Hobbs.

Plot
As described in a film magazine reviews, when Anita Leland’s team runs away from her, a muscular stranger intervenes, stops the horses and assists her to dismount. He gives his name as Jack, and when Sammy Sills proposes that he should become his partner in working a mine, he consents, as the proposition enables him to be near the young woman. Jack engages in a fight with Bill Stearns, a husky loafer, and thrashes him soundly. It transpires that his partner Sammy is also in love with Anita, having known her since childhood, and is engaged to her. Jack makes up his mind to leave and rides away. Sammy is attacked by the Steams gang and slain. Suspicion of Sammy's death falls upon Jack, which is strengthened when his share of the gold is found on him. He escapes. Meanwhile, Anita goes to Sammy’s deserted cabin, finds a note written by the dying man naming Stearns as his assailant. Steams appears and tries to seize the evidence, but Jack arrives and saves her. Steams confesses to the crime.

Cast
 Bob Custer as Jack
 Mary Beth Milford as Anita Leland
 Monte Collins as Joe Leland
 Hayford Hobbs as Sammy Sills
 Buck Moulton as Bill Stearns

References

Bibliography
 Connelly, Robert B. The Silents: Silent Feature Films, 1910-36, Volume 40, Issue 2. December Press, 1998.
 Munden, Kenneth White. The American Film Institute Catalog of Motion Pictures Produced in the United States, Part 1. University of California Press, 1997.

External links
 
 

1925 films
1925 Western (genre) films
1920s English-language films
American silent feature films
Silent American Western (genre) films
American black-and-white films
Films directed by William James Craft
Film Booking Offices of America films
1920s American films